The 1928 Australian Grand Prix was a motor race held on the Phillip Island road circuit, on Phillip Island, Victoria, Australia on 31 March 1928. Although now known as the first Australian Grand Prix, the race was actually staged as the 100 Miles Road Race and it did not assume the Australian Grand Prix title until some years later. It was organised by the Victorian Light Car Club.

The overall winner was Arthur Waite driving an Austin 7. The winning car averaged 56.25 mph (90.50 km/h).

Race summary
The race was originally to be held on Monday 26 March however rain forced postponement until Saturday 31 March. It was open to "light" cars of up to 2-litre capacity and it attracted 30 entries, of which 25 were accepted and 17 started.

Competing cars were classified into classes according to cylinder capacity:
 Class A: Cars up to 750cc
 Class B: Cars over 750cc and up to 1100cc
 Class C: Cars over 1100cc and up to 1500cc
 Class D: Cars over 1500cc and up to 2000cc

The event was conducted as two separate races, with the first held in the morning for Class B and D entries, and the second held in the afternoon, for Class A and C cars. The competitor setting the fastest time was to receive a £100 trophy donated by Charles Brown Kellow and would be regarded as "Champion of the Day". Trophies were also to be awarded for first and second places in each class and all other competitors who finished within the 2½ hour time limit would receive a Club award.

Only two cars completed the course without stopping. They were the Morris Cowley of J. O. McCutcheon and the Austin 12 of C. R. Dickason.

Race results

Race One

Race Two

Overall classification

Notes
 Ret = Retired from race
 DNS = Did not start race

1927 Australian Grand Prix 
Although the 1928 race is recognised by Motorsport Australia as the first Australian Grand Prix, a dispute exists given that an event held in Goulburn, New South Wales in 1927 was actually advertised as a grand prix at the time. However the 1927 event was not a motor race but rather a series of elimination sprints.

References

External links
 Australia's First Grand Prix To Start Next Monday, The Weekly Times, March 24 1928, page 74, as archived at trove.nla.gov.au
 Rain causes postponement, Argus, Monday 26 March 1928, p.  16, as archived at trove.nla.gov.au
 Speed tests at Cowes, Argus, Tuesday 27 March 1928, p.  15, as archived at trove.nla.gov.au
 Contest at Cowes, Argus, Monday 2 April 1928, p.  23, as archived at trove.nla.gov.au
 1928 100 Miles Road Race, Phillip Island…, primotipo.com

Grand Prix
Australian Grand Prix
Motorsport at Phillip Island
Australian Grand Prix